The 1869 Glasgow and Aberdeen Universities by-election was fought on 22 November 1869.  The by-election was fought due to the resignation of the incumbent MP of the Liberal Party, James Moncreiff, to become a Lord Justice Clerk.  It was won by the Conservative candidate Edward Strathearn Gordon.

References

1869 elections in the United Kingdom
1869 in Scotland
1860s elections in Scotland
By-elections to the Parliament of the United Kingdom in Glasgow and Aberdeen Universities
19th century in Aberdeen
1860s in Glasgow
November 1869 events